Wałdowo may refer to the following places in Poland:

Wałdowo, Świecie County (north-central Poland)
Wałdowo, Sępólno County (north-central Poland)
Wałdowo, Pomeranian Voivodeship (north Poland)
Wałdowo, Iława County (north-east Poland)
Wałdowo, Ostróda County (north-east Poland)